Hampton is a town in Franklin County, Iowa, United States. The population was 4,337 at the time of the 2020 census. It is the county seat of Franklin County.

Geography
Hampton's longitude and latitude coordinates, in decimal form are 42.743164, -93.207872.

Climate

According to the Köppen Climate Classification system, Hampton has a hot-summer humid continental climate, abbreviated "Dfa" on climate maps.

Demographics

2000 census
At the 2000 census there were 4,218 people, 1,766 households, and 1,110 families living in the city. The racial makup of the city was 90.9% White, 0.1% African American, 0.3% Native American, 0.2% Asian, 7.7% from other races, and 0.8% from two or more races. Hispanic or Latino of any race were 11.0%.

Of the 1,766 households 28.0% had children under the age of 18 living with them, 50.8% were married couples living together, 8.4% had a female householder with no husband present, and 37.1% were non-families. 32.4% of households were one person and 18.6% were one person aged 65 or older. The average household size was 2.30 and the average family size was 2.89.

Age spread: 23.2% under the age of 18, 8.3% from 18 to 24, 24.3% from 25 to 44, 22.1% from 45 to 64, and 22.1% 65 or older. The median age was 41 years. For every 100 females, there were 90.7 males. For every 100 females age 18 and over, there were 88.1 males.

The median household income was $33,005 and the median family income  was $45,391. Males had a median income of $29,706 versus $20,909 for females. The per capita income for the city was $19,907. About 7.0% of families and 9.4% of the population were below the poverty line, including 12.6% of those under age 18 and 8.2% of those age 65 or over.

Economy 
In 2007, the 200 MW Buffalo Creek Wind Farm was developed by Wind Capital Group and later sold to Alliant Energy later the same year.
Hampton was at one time home of Winnebago Industries Fiberglass division until the plant was moved to Forest City in 2008.

Education
Hampton–Dumont Community School District operates the area public schools. It was established on July 1, 1995, by the merger of the Dumont and Hampton school districts.

Arts and culture 
The Franklin Country Fair is held in Hampton. In past years the star attractions have been Marty Robbins, Marty Stuart, Luke Bryan, Trace Adkins, Rascal Flatts, David Nail, The Marshall Tucker Band and Lonestar. At the 2011 fair the acts were Lincoln Brewster, Kellie Pickler, and Charlie Daniels Band.

Parks and recreation 
Beeds Lake State Park is located a few miles northwest of the city.

Transportation 
The city is intersected by two major highways: U.S. Route 65 and Iowa Highway 3. Interstate 35 is nine miles west of town. There is also an airport, Hampton Municipal, located on the city's southwest side.

Notable people  

Jack Bailey (1907–1980), actor, host of the game show Queen for a Day
Tom Latham (born 1948), U.S. Representative for 
William D. Leahy (1875–1959), Fleet Admiral, Chief of Staff to President Roosevelt during World War II
Arthur E. Rankin (1888–1962), Iowa educator and politician
Thomas J. B. Robinson (1868–1958), U.S. Representative from Iowa
Kent Slater (born 1945), Illinois state legislator and judge
Raef LaFrentz (born 1976), former NBA player.

See also

 All-American Red Heads

References

External links
 
 Hampton Economic Development
 Hampton Area Chamber of Commerce
 Hampton Main Street
 Hampton Chronicle
 City Data Comprehensive Statistical Data and more about Hampton

 
Cities in Iowa
Cities in Franklin County, Iowa
County seats in Iowa